Kim Min-kyu (born March 12, 2001), better known by his stage name Minkyu, is a South Korean actor, singer, television host, and model under Jellyfish Entertainment. He has been cast in the Playlist's web drama "Pop Out Boy!" as the male lead Chun Nam-wook in 2020 and as Seo Ji-han in Idol: The Coup.

Early life
Minkyu was born on March 12, 2001, in Gumi, North Gyeongsang Province,  South Korea. He has a younger sister who is two years younger than him. He studied at Munhyeon Elementary School, Hwaam Middle School and Moonhyeon High School. He was transferred to Youngdong High School due to work commitments.

Career

2019: Produce X 101, modeling, first fan meeting tour, first award

In March 2019, Minkyu represented Jellyfish Entertainment together with fellow trainee Choi Jun-Seong on the reality survival show Produce X 101 for the chance to debut in a Mnet boy group. He ranked 12th on the finale of Produce X 101 and was eliminated from the final lineup, barely missing the mark to becoming the member of X1. Despite his elimination, Minkyu's appearance on the show led him to receive many advertisement offers.

On August 21, he became the first male model for the beauty brand Banila Co.. He also partook in multiple magazine shoots like DAZED, NYLON and Grazia. On August 25, he held his first fan-meeting 'Nineteen, Minkyu' at Kwangwoon University's Donghae Culture and Art Center. On September 23, he was chosen as a model for the American clothing retailer Guess (clothing). On November 9, he started his first fan-meeting tour 'Nineteen, Minkyu' in Bangkok, Thailand. On November 16, he held it in Taipei, Taiwan. On December 5, he was cast to host MBC Music's new program Pink Festa. On December 7, he held his first fan-sign for Banila Co.. December 16, he held 'Nineteen, Minkyu' in Japan. On December 17, he won the Hot Rookie Award on First Brand Awards 2020.

2020–present: Hosting, acting debut
On February 7, 2020, Minkyu was chosen as one of the new hosts for SBS MTV's music program The Show alongside The Boyz's Juyeon and Everglow's Sihyeon.

In June 2020, Minkyu made his acting debut in Playlist's web drama "Pop Out Boy!" as the male lead Chun Nam-wook.

Discography

Soundtrack appearances

Filmography

Television series

Web series

Television shows

Web show

Ambassadorship

Tours 
 Kim Minkyu 1st Fanmeeting Tour "Nineteen, Minkyu"

Awards

First Brand Awards

References

External links 
 
 

2001 births
Living people
South Korean male idols
21st-century South Korean male singers
Jellyfish Entertainment artists
Produce 101 contestants
South Korean male television actors
21st-century South Korean male actors
South Korean male web series actors